John Wheadon deGravelles (born November 2, 1949) is a United States district judge of the United States District Court for the Middle District of Louisiana, based in the capital city of Baton Rouge.

Biography

DeGravelles is the son of the late Charles deGravelles and Virginia deGravelles, Louisiana Republicans who were once members of the Republican National Committee. The senior deGravelleses were on the RNC at the same time in 1968. DeGravelles has a twin brother, Charles Nations deGravelles, an Episcopalian archdeacon, were born on November 2, 1949, in Lafayette, Louisiana. DeGravelles received a Bachelor of Arts degree in 1971 from Louisiana State University in Baton Rouge. He received a Juris Doctor in 1974 from the Louisiana State University Paul M. Hebert Law Center with Order of the Coif designation.

From 1974 to 1986, he worked at the law firm of Dué, Dodson, deGravelles, Robinson & Caskey (and its predecessor firms), becoming a partner in 1976. He was a solo practitioner from 1986 to 1987. Starting in 1987, he was a partner at deGravelles, Palmintier, Holthaus & Frugé LLP (and its predecessor firms). During his career, he has handled a wide variety of civil litigation in state and federal courts.

During his career, deGravelles has been actively engaged in legal education and scholarship. Beginning in 1994, deGravelles became a member of the adjunct faculty at Louisiana State University Paul M. Hebert Law Center where he taught courses in Maritime Torts, Advanced Litigation, Pre-Trial Litigation, and Federal Courts.

Since 1993, deGravelles has served as a member of the faculty of Tulane University Law School's Summer Program in Rhodes, Greece, teaching Maritime Personal Injury Law. In association with Tulane Law School, deGravelles has presented lectures on various topics of maritime law in St. Petersburg, Russia; Istanbul, Turkey; Odessa, Ukraine; and Thessaloniki, Greece. In 2015, deGravelles served as a member of the faculty of the LSU Law School's summer program in Lyon, France, teaching maritime law.

DeGravelles was awarded a Fulbright Scholarship to teach American Maritime Private International Law at the Aristotle University of Thessaloniki Law School in Thessaloniki, Greece, during the fall semester of 2001. While there, he also gave lectures on the American judicial system. In March, 2011, in association with the Center for International Legal Studies, deGravelles taught a course on the American judicial system at the Lugansk State University of the International Affairs Law School in Lugansk, Ukraine.

During his career, deGravelles has been active in legal organizations. From 1992 to 1993, he served as president of the Louisiana Association for Justice, formerly the Louisiana Trial Lawyers Association. In 1998, he was the president of the Louisiana chapter of the American Board of Trial Advocates8. He was a member of the national board of governors of the American Association for Justice (formerly the American Trial Lawyers Association) from 1993 to 1996 and again from 2011 to 2014. He was admitted as a Fellow of the International Academy of Trial Lawyers in 2006 and the Litigation Counsel of American in 2009.  In 2015, he was elected President of the Dean Henry George McMahon American Inn of Court, Inn No. 71.  He has been since 1974 a member of the American and Baton Rouge bar associations and the Maritime Law Association since 1996.

Federal judicial service

On March 13, 2014, President Barack Obama nominated deGravelles to serve as a judge of the United States District Court for the Middle District of Louisiana, to the seat vacated by Judge James Joseph Brady, a Democrat who assumed senior status on December 31, 2013. He received a hearing before the United States Senate Judiciary Committee on May 20, 2014. On June 19, 2014 his nomination was reported out of committee by a voice vote. On July 16, 2014, Senate Majority Leader Harry Reid filed a motion to invoke cloture on deGravelles nomination. The Senate invoked cloture on July 22, 2014 by a 57–39 vote. Later that same day deGravelles was confirmed by a 100–0 vote. He received his judicial commission on July 23, 2014.

Notable cases

On August 31, 2014, deGravelles partially blocked enforcement of Louisiana's new abortion law which took effect on September 1. The measure requires those performing abortions to have admitting privileges at a hospital within thirty miles of the abortion facility. 

In October 2015, deGravelles issued a temporary restraining order that blocked the administration of then Governor Bobby Jindal from defunding Planned Parenthood within the state. Jindal spokesman Mike Reed said the state would appeal deGravelles' ruling.

References

External links

Hearing transcript for on Planned Parenthood v. Kliebert

1949 births
Living people
Judges of the United States District Court for the Middle District of Louisiana
Louisiana Democrats
Louisiana lawyers
Louisiana State University Law Center alumni
People from Lafayette, Louisiana
United States district court judges appointed by Barack Obama
21st-century American judges